13 at a Table (also known as Tredici a tavola) is a 2004 Italian comedy film written and directed by Enrico Oldoini.

It was entered into the main competition at the 2005 Tokyo International Film Festival.

Cast    
Giancarlo Giannini  as Giulio 
Nicolas Vaporidis  as Giulio at 18 
Kasia Smutniak  as  Anna 
 Manuela Borlotti  as  Arianna
   as  Daria 
Paolo Bonacelli  as  Grandpa Giulio 
   as  Grandma Ester 
   as  Roberto 
Angela Finocchiaro  as  Piera 
   as  Matilde 
Alessandro Benvenuti  as  Antonio 
 Niccolò Enriquez  as  Pietro 
 Andrea Giuliano  as  Furio
   as  Moreno 
Giada Di Miceli as  Silvia 
Carlo Monni as Paolino

See also 
 List of Italian films of 2004

References

External links

Italian comedy films
2004 comedy films
2004 films
Films directed by Enrico Oldoini
2000s Italian-language films